Daniel Soares Neves (born 3 June 1980 at Minas Gerais, Brazil), simply known as Daniel Baroni, is a Brazilian footballer with Brazilian and Spanish dual nationality.

Career
Daniel Baroni was a product of the Clube Atlético Mineiro youth academy. After failing to feature regularly the senior side, he had spells at several lower-league clubs in Brazil, including Valeriodoce Esporte Clube and Vila Nova Futebol Clube. Daniel Baroni continued to be a journeyman, playing for clubs in Vietnam, Bolivia and Greece. He signed for his seventeenth club in 2010, Spanish Tercera División side UE Cornellà.

He played as a striker for Kedah FA in the Malaysia Super League for the 2012 season. His contract was terminated .

Daniel Baroni, after finishing his career as a professional soccer player, has continued in the world of soccer, is a UEFA PRO coach, sports coordinator and methodology director, as well as CEO of the company Efficiency Futbol Academy, based in Barcelona, Spain and Santa Luzia MG.

References

External links
 
 Daniel Soares Neves ( Baroni ) in Facebook
 Daniel "Baroni" Soares Neves at Liga Indonesia
  at Give me goal
 Daniel Baroni with Kedah Kedah FA

1980 births
Living people
Brazilian footballers
Brazilian people of Spanish descent
Brazilian expatriate footballers
Brazilian expatriate sportspeople in Indonesia
Brazilian expatriate sportspeople in Malaysia
Expatriate footballers in Indonesia
Expatriate footballers in Malaysia
Rio Claro Futebol Clube players
UE Cornellà players
PSM Makassar players
Liga 1 (Indonesia) players
Kedah Darul Aman F.C. players
Malaysia Super League players
Association football midfielders
Footballers from Belo Horizonte